is a Japanese department store chain in Fukuoka Prefecture and owned by , a group company of Isetan Mitsukoshi Holdings, Ltd. Two stores are in Tenjin (est. 1936) and Kurume (est. 1972). One of Kyushu's oldest department stores, Iwataya has been in business in Tenjin for 70 years. In addition to garments and household goods, Iwataya offers items of a wide variety of genres as well as children's brands.

Former stores 
Tobata
Yame
Nishijin
Hita
Kumamoto

References

External links
 Iwataya

Department stores of Japan
Companies based in Fukuoka Prefecture